Andrzej Stalmach (1 May 1942 – 14 September 2020) was a Polish athlete. He competed in the men's long jump at the 1964 Summer Olympics and the 1968 Summer Olympics.

References

External links
 

1942 births
2020 deaths
Athletes (track and field) at the 1964 Summer Olympics
Athletes (track and field) at the 1968 Summer Olympics
Polish male long jumpers
Olympic athletes of Poland
People from Jaworzno